Ndidiamaka Nneoma Amutah-Onukagha (born 1981) is an American researcher who is the Julia A. Okoro Professor of Black Maternal Health at the Tufts University School of Medicine. Her research considers women's health disparities in Black women. Amutah-Onukagha is the inaugural Tufts University Assistant Dean of Diversity, Equity, and Inclusion for Public Health. She was named the American Public Health Association Maternal and Child Health Section's Young Professional of the Year in 2019.

Early life and education 
Amutah-Onukagha was born and raised in Trenton, New Jersey and attended Trenton Central High School. Her parents are from Nigeria. At age fifteen, Amutah-Onukagha lost her friend to complications after childbirth, which motivated Amutah-Onukagha to pursue a college degree. She was an undergraduate student at Rutgers University, where she majored in African studies and public health. She joined George Washington University as a graduate student and earned a master's degree in public health. After earning her doctorate, Amutah-Onukagha joined the University of Maryland, College Park. She was named a W. K. Kellogg Foundation research fellow at Morgan State University in 2012 before joining Montclair State University to teach public health.

Research and career 
Amutah-Onukagha investigates women's health and maternal mortality. In 2017  Amutah-Onukagha joined Tufts University. Her research is supported by the National Institutes of Health and Robert Wood Johnson Foundation. At Tufts University, Amutah-Onukagha founded the Maternal Outcomes for Translational Health Equity Research (MOTHER) Lab, a research lab that looks to eliminate maternal health disparities. HIV/AIDS is the leading cause of mortality in Black women aged between 18 and 34 in Boston, and Amutah-Onukagha looks to understand and disrupt these pathways.

During the COVID-19 pandemic, Amutah-Onukagha was appointed to the Massachusetts COVID-19 Maternal Equity Coalition. The coalition, which looked to improve maternal health for people of color during the pandemic, sought to address racial inequality in perinatal outcomes.

Awards and honors 
 2019 American Public Health Association Maternal and Child Health Section's Young Professional of the Year Award
 2020 National Minority Quality Forum Top 40 under 40 Minority Leaders in Healthcare
 2022 John C. MacQueen Lecture Award

Selected publications

References 

1981 births
Living people
People from Trenton, New Jersey
Physicians from New Jersey
Rutgers University alumni
Trenton Central High School alumni
University of Maryland, College Park alumni
George Washington University alumni
Tufts University School of Medicine faculty
American people of Nigerian descent
21st-century American physicians
21st-century American women physicians